Jim Webb Sings Jim Webb is the debut album by American singer-songwriter Jimmy Webb, released in 1968 on Epic Records.

Background
The album consists of a set of early demo recordings, redubbed and orchestrated by Epic Records without Webb's participation or consent. None of Webb's hit songs from that period appear on the album, and the sound quality of the recording is inferior. Webb later denounced the release in the strongest terms:

Critical reception

Webb strongly disliked the album. In his review for Allmusic, Bruce Eder wrote that Epic was "looking for the same effect as those early Randy Newman albums on Warner Bros. with far less success, artistic or commercial". Eder concluded that the album is of "purely historical interest".

Track listing

Personnel
Music
 Jimmy Webb – vocals, piano
 Elton "Skip" Mosher – backing vocals
 Jim Stotler – backing vocals
 Greg Waitman – backing vocals

Production
 Hank Levine – producer, orchestra arrangements and conductor
 Jimmy Webb – song arrangements 
 Bob Breault – recording engineer
 Sy Mitchell – recording engineer
 Sid Maurer – cover painting

References

1968 debut albums
Jimmy Webb albums
Epic Records albums